There have been numerous sugar cane farmers−growers trade unions in Fiji and in the preceding British Colonony of Fiji (1874−1970).

Some of the Fijian cane growers unions are/were provincially based, as indicated by their names: Nadroga Fijian Cane Growers Association in Nadroga-Navosa Province, the Ra Fijian Cane Growers Association in Ra Province, and the Ba Fijian Cane Growers Association in Ba Province. Other regionally based unions include Labasa Kisan Sangh, the Rewa Planters Union, and the Southern Division Kisan Sangh. 

Other farmers unions were formed to provide leverage to ethnic sections of the community, such as Indians in Fiji and indigenous Fijian people.

History
The first farmers union in Fiji was the Indian Cane Growers Association, established in 1919. It negotiated with the Colonial Sugar Refining Company, the predominant sugar cane plantations and raw sugar production company established in 1880. The 1921 strike by sugar cane farmers was a spontaneous action led by Vashist Muni.

Umbrella organisations were formed to present a united front in negotiating with the CSR and later the Fiji Sugar Corporation (FSC) (est. 1973). In 1959, the Federation of Cane Growers was formed, and in 1980 the Joint Committee of Cane Growers Associations was formed.

Ethnicity and unions
The Fijian cane growers unions were ethnically and provincially based as indicated by their names; Nadroga Fijian Cane Growers Association, the Ra Fijian Cane Growers Association, and the Ba Fijian Cane Growers Association. Some unions claimed to be open for everyone but their membership indicated sectional interest. For example, the Maha Sangh had a predominantly South Indian membership, the Vishal Sangh had a predominantly Sikh membership, and the Kisan Sangh had a predominantly North Indian membership.

In 1959, when the Federation of Cane Growers was negotiating the new cane contract with the Colonial Sugar Refining Company (CSR), three indigenous Fijian cane farmers unions were set up to send three Fijian delegates to the Federation although ethnic Fijians made up less than 5% of the cane farmers.

List of unions
Current and former sugar cane farmers−growers unions in Fiji, by date established, include:

 1919 - Indian Cane Growers Association
 1934 - Planters Association
 1937 - Kisan Sangh
 1941 - Maha Sangh
 1953 - Rewa Planters Union
 1946 - Vishal Sangh
 1946 - Southern Division Kisan Sangh
 1950 - Labasa Kisan Sangh
 1959 - Federation of Cane Growers
 1959 - Nadroga Fijian Cane Growers Association
 1959 - Ra Fijian Cane Growers Association
 1959 - Ba Fijian Cane Growers Association
 1979 - National Farmers Union of Fiji
 1980 - Joint Committee of Cane Growers Associations
 1992 - Fiji Cane Growers Association

See also

References

 
.
.